Brett Hugh Goldsmith (born 4 June 1961) is an Australian-born songwriter, music programmer/producer and photographer.

Personal life 
Goldsmith is the son of British-born actress Rona Newton-John (1941–2013) and Melbourne nightclub owner Brian Goldsmith. His grandfather was University of Melbourne professor Brinley ("Bryn") Newton-John. His great-grandfather was German-Jewish physicist and Nobel Prize winner Max Born. 

Olivia Newton-John was his aunt, while singer/actress Tottie Goldsmith is his younger sister and race car driver Emerson Newton-John his younger half-brother.

Music 

In the mid 1980s Goldsmith programmed (and played bass guitar & keyboards on) the album Chantoozies for the band Chantoozies, a top ten album which was released through Mushroom Records. 

Goldsmith co-wrote the singles "Wanna Be Up" & "Kiss n Tell" with fellow band member Eve von Bibra.
"Wanna Be Up" peaked at no. 8 on the ARIA singles charts. He was also one of the original male members of the band.

After leaving Chantoozies, Goldsmith toured with James Reyne as his bass guitarist. They co-wrote the song Black and Blue World on Reyne's 1991 album Electric Digger Dandy.
In 2013 Goldsmith released a solo album, Ordinary Life though MGM Distribution (Australia). 

The title track was covered by Olivia Newton-John in 2014 on her EP Hotel Sessions, also co-written & produced by Goldsmith.

Photography 
Goldsmith is also a photographer.

References

External links 
 Personal Site

1961 births
Living people
Australian people of German-Jewish descent
Australian photographers
Australian songwriters
Australian record producers
Chantoozies members